The Football Association of Slovenia ( or NZS) is the governing body of football in Slovenia. It organizes the first division (1. SNL), second division (2. SNL), third division (East and West), Slovenian Cup, Slovenian Women's League, and other competitions. It is also responsible for the Slovenia national football team and the Slovenia women's national football team. It was founded as Ljubljana Football Subassociation on 24 April 1920.

Presidents
Danijel Lepin (1948–1950)
Martin Grajf (1950–1952)
Franc Sitar (1952–1954)
Jože Grbec (1954–1958)
Stane Lavrič (1958–1962)
Stane Vrhovnik (1962–1968)
Roman Vobič (1968–1970)
Jože Snoj (1970–1973, 1976–1978)
Tone Florjančič (1973–1976)
Miro Samardžija (1978–1981)
Boris Godina (1981)
Branko Elsner (1982–1985)
Marko Ilešič (1985–1989)
Rudi Zavrl (1989–2009)
Ivan Simič (2009–2011)
Aleksander Čeferin (2011–2016)
Radenko Mijatović (2016–present)

References

External links
 
Slovenia at FIFA website
Slovenia at UEFA website

Slovenia
 
Futsal in Slovenia
Sports governing bodies in Slovenia
Sports organizations established in 1920
1920 establishments in Slovenia